is a private junior and senior high school in Fujiidera, Osaka Prefecture. It is a part of the Shi-Tennoji Gakuen, a group of  Buddhist educational institutions affiliated with Shitennoji temple in Osaka.

The school opened as a junior high school in April 2014, and the senior high school division opened in 2017.

References

External links
 Shitennoji Gakuen Junior and Senior High School 

2014 establishments in Japan
Educational institutions established in 2014
Private schools in Japan
Buddhism in Japan
Education in Osaka Prefecture
High schools in Osaka Prefecture
Shitennō-ji
Fujiidera